Johanna Rutgera 'Joke' van Leeuwen (born 24 September 1952) is a Dutch author, illustrator, and cabaret performer.

Life and career 
Johanna Rutgera van Leeuwen was born on 24 September 1952 in The Hague, Netherlands. She studied at the University of Brussels and has won various awards for her literature for children which sometimes uses a quest as a theme. Her awards includes the Dutch Youth literature award which is only given every three years.

Many of her books have been translated into German by Mirjam Pressler and Hanni Ehlers.

Awards
For oeuvre
 Theo Thijssen-prijs (2000)
 Gouden Ganzenveer (2010)
 Constantijn Huygens Prize (2012)

For individual works
 Gouden Penseel (1980) for Een huis met zeven kamers
 Zilveren Griffel (1980) for Een huis met zeven kamers
 Zilveren Griffel (1982) for De metro van Magnus
 Gouden Griffel (1986) for Deesje
 Zilveren Penseel (1986) for Deesje
 Deutscher Jugendliteraturpreis (1988) for Deesje
 Zilveren Griffel (1989) for We zijn allang begonnen, maar nu begint het echt
 Zilveren Griffel (1993) for Niet wiet, wel nel
 C. Buddingh'-prijs (1995) for Laatste lezers
 Zilveren Griffel (1996) for Ik ben ik
 Golden Owl (1997) for Iep!
 Zilveren Griffel (1997) for Iep!
 Zilveren Griffel (1999) for Kukel
 Zilveren Griffel (2005) for Waarom een buitenboordmotor eenzaam is
 Gouden Penseel (2007) for Heb je mijn zusje gezien?
 Zilveren Griffel (2007) for Heb je mijn zusje gezien?
 Zilveren Penseel (2009) for Een halve hond heel denken
 AKO Literatuurprijs (2013) for Feest van het begin
 Zilveren Griffel (2016) for Mooi boek
 Zilveren Griffel (2018) for Toen ik

Bibliography 
 (1978) De Appelmoesstraat is anders (The Apple Sauce Street Is Different)
 (1979) Een huis met zeven kamers (A House With Seven Rooms)
 (1981) De metro van Magnus (The Subway of Magnus)
 (1983) Sus en Jum, 1, 2, 3 (Sus and Jum, 1, 2, 3)
 (1985) Deesje
 (1985) Fien wil een flus (Fien wants a flus)
 (1988) We zijn allang begonnen, maar nu begint het echt (We have already started, but now it really starts)
 (1992) Niet Wiet, wel Nel (Not Wiet, but Nel)
 (1994) Laatste lezers (Last readers)
 (1995) Ik ben ik (I am me)
 (1996) Iep! (Eep!)
 (1998) Kukel
 (2004) Waarom een buitenboordmotor eenzaam is (Why an outboard motor is lonely)
 (2006) Heb je mijn zusje gezien? (Have you seen my sister)
 (2008) Een halve hond heel denken (Thinking half a dog whole)
 (2012) Feest van het begin (Feast of the beginning)
 (2015) De onervarenen (The unexperienced)
 (2015) Mooi boek (Beautiful book)
 (2017) Toen ik (When I)

References

External links 

 

1952 births
20th-century Dutch novelists
20th-century Dutch women writers
21st-century Dutch novelists
21st-century Dutch women writers
Constantijn Huygens Prize winners
Dutch children's book illustrators
Dutch children's writers
Dutch illustrators
Dutch women illustrators
Dutch women children's writers
Living people
Writers from The Hague
Dutch women novelists
Woutertje Pieterse Prize winners
C. Buddingh' Prize winners
Gouden Griffel winners
Gouden Penseel winners